Thomas William Cumming (1814 or 1815October 13, 1855) was an American businessman and politician who served one term as a U.S. Representative from New York from 1853 to 1855.

Biography 
Born in Frederick, Maryland, in 1814 or 1815, Cumming moved to Georgia. He was appointed a midshipman in the United States Navy on May 19, 1832. He was promoted to passed midshipman on June 23, 1838, and served until February 23, 1841, when he resigned. While in the Navy he was a member of the Wilkes Expedition in 1838.
He moved to Brooklyn, New York. He became a druggist and importer of drugs in New York City and subsequently engaged in mercantile pursuits in Brooklyn, New York from 1843 to 1853.

Tenure in Congress 
Cumming was elected as a Democrat to the Thirty-third Congress (March 4, 1853 – March 3, 1855).

Death 
He died in Brooklyn, New York on October 13, 1855. He was interred in Green-Wood Cemetery.

References

1810s births
1855 deaths
Politicians from Frederick, Maryland
Burials at Green-Wood Cemetery
Democratic Party members of the United States House of Representatives from New York (state)
American pharmacists
19th-century American politicians